Presidential elections were held in South Ossetia on November 12, 2006, coinciding with the South Ossetian independence referendum. Incumbent Eduard Kokoity was seeking a second full five-year term. He was re-elected with more than 98.1%.  According to the de facto authorities, the election was monitored by a team of 34 international observers from Germany, Austria, Poland,  Sweden and other countries at 78 polling stations. The Ukrainian delegation was led by Nataliya Vitrenko of the Progressive Socialist Party of Ukraine. The election process was criticised by local civic society and the results were likely to be inflated.

Candidates
Leonid Tibilov, head of the South Ossetian group within the Joint Control Commission for the Georgian-Ossetian conflict
Inal Pukhayev, head of the Tskhinvali district administration
Oleg Gabodze, temporarily unemployed

Results

Alternative elections and referendum
South Ossetian opposition politicians, some of whom had left Tskhinvali due to a conflict with the de facto president Eduard Kokoity, set up an alternative Central Election Commission and nominated their candidates for presidency: Gogi Chigoyev, Teimuraz Djeragoyev, Tamar Charayeva, and Dmitry Sanakoyev, who served as defense minister and then as prime minister for several months in 2001 under Kokoity's predecessor, Ludwig Chibirov. Voters were also to answer a question: "do you agree with the renewal of talks with Georgia on a federal union." The alternative elections and referendum were held in the villages with mixed Georgian-Ossetian population not controlled by the secessionist government. The Salvation Union of South Ossetia which organised the election turned down a request from a Georgian NGO, “Multinational Georgia”, to monitor it and the released results were also very likely to be inflated.

Although Georgian government has officially declared both elections illegal, Kokoity accused Tbilisi of staging the alternative elections in order to create a "puppet government" in South Ossetia.

References
 Georgia: South Ossetia Seeks To Contain Opposition Challenge, Radio Free Europe, 2006-11-10
Staging ‘Alternative Choice’ for S.Ossetia, Online Magazine - Civil Georgia, November 7, 2006.
South Ossetia to Elect Two Presidents, Kommersant, November 11, 2006.
Georgia: South Ossetia Seeks To Contain Opposition Challenge, Radio Free Europe/Radio Liberty, November 10, 2006.

Presidential elections in South Ossetia
2006 in Georgia (country)
South Ossetia
South Ossetia
Presidential election